Daphnella thiasotes is a species of sea snail, a marine gastropod mollusk in the family Raphitomidae.

Description
The length of the shell attains 8 mm, its diameter 4.25 mm.

(Original description) The solid, fusiform shell contains six whorls. The protoconch is pitchy black, the remainder are with bright ochreous tinting. In the younger specimens transverse shining white rows of large gemmae  cross the whorls just above the sutures, and in the middle of the body whorl, below, there are ochre bands. In the body whorl this is followed by two smaller rows of gemmae, and then by a pitch black line reaching from the upper portion of the columellar margin, across the back of the shell, to the base of the outer lip. The more mature shell is conspicuous for the very swollen row of white peripheral nodules, banded below with fulvous colour. The outer lip is slightly incrassate. The siphonal canal is short. The columellar margin simple.

Distribution
This marine species occurs off the Loyalty Islands and the Mactan Island, Philippines

References

External links
 

thiasotes
Gastropods described in 1896